The 1944 New Brunswick general election was held on August 28, 1944, to elect 48 members to the 40th New Brunswick Legislative Assembly, the governing house of the province of New Brunswick, Canada. The incumbent Liberal government was re-elected.

The members were elected in 17 districts. One district, Moncton, elected one member. The other elected from two to four members, through the Multiple non-transferable vote system.

References

1944 elections in Canada
Elections in New Brunswick
1944 in New Brunswick
August 1944 events